Paul Kescenovitz "Kessy" Jr. (May 17, 1915 – January 3, 1971) was an American professional basketball player. Kessy played in the National Basketball League for the Cleveland Allmen Transfers and the Pittsburgh Raiders at the end of the 1944–45 season. He appeared in four games for Cleveland and one game for Pittsburgh.

References

1915 births
1971 deaths
American men's basketball players
Basketball players from Milwaukee
Centers (basketball)
Cleveland Allmen Transfers players
Forwards (basketball)
Milwaukee Panthers men's basketball players
Pittsburgh Raiders players